Eupithecia ericeata is a moth in the family Geometridae first described by Jules Pierre Rambur in 1833. It is found in most of southern Europe and the Near East.

The wingspan is about 17–19 mm. Adults are variable, ranging from a typical light form with a distinct pattern on the forewings to a unicolorous melanistic form.

The larvae feed on Erica, Juniperus and Cytisus species.

Subspecies
Eupithecia ericeata ericeata
Eupithecia ericeata euxinata Bohatsch, 1893 (Ukraine, Greece)

References

Moths described in 1833
ericeata
Moths of Europe
Moths of Asia
Taxa named by Jules Pierre Rambur